Time to Dance is a 2021 Indian dance film directed by Stanley D'Costa. Produced by Lizelle D'Souza it features Sooraj Pancholi, Isabelle Kaif (sister of Katrina Kaif) and Waluscha De Sousa in the lead roles. The film was theatrically released in India on 12 March 2021.

Synopsis
An injured ballroom dancer gets her hopes up when she meets the perfect dance partner. Overcoming her painful past, she strives to succeed without losing her heart to her new teammate.

Cast 
 Sooraj Pancholi as Rishabh
 Isabelle Kaif as Isha
 Waluscha De Sousa as Meher
 Saqib Saleem as Navdeep Singh
 Rajpal Yadav as Sada
 Natasha Powell as William' mother
 Guru Randhawa as himself in the song Munde Mar Gaye (special appearance)
Martin Rycroft as William

Production

Development 
Stanley D'Costa's directional debut portrays Sooraj Pancholi as a street dancer and Isabelle Kaif as a ballroom Latin dancer. It also introduces British Actor Sammy Jonas Heaney in important roles.. The training for the  latin ballroom dances for  the lead actors  is  done by Sneh Vadhani.

Filming 
Film's pre-production began in March 2018, and principal photography commenced at London in June 2018.

Soundtrack

The film's music was composed by Rochak Kohli, Vishal Mishra, Guru Randhawa — Vee,  Gurinder Seagal and Vijay Verma while the lyrics were written by Kumaar, Kunaal Vermaa, Guru Randhawa, Geet Sagar, Rajesh Manthan, Neha Karode and Amrita Talukder.

See also
ABCD (franchise)

References

External links 
 
 

2021 films
2020s Hindi-language films
Indian dance films
2020s dance films
Films scored by Guru Randhawa
Films scored by Rochak Kohli
Films scored by Vishal Mishra